Malgasochilo is a genus of moths of the family Crambidae. It contains only one species, Malgasochilo autarotellus, which is found in Madagascar (Nosy Be). The forewings of this species are dull-greyish brown with a length of 12 mm.

See also
List of moths of Madagascar

References

Crambinae
Crambidae genera
Monotypic moth genera
Taxa named by Stanisław Błeszyński